John Frederick "Fred" Ward (birth registered second ¼ 1932 – 13 November 2012) was an English professional rugby league footballer who played in the 1950s and 1960s, and coached in the 1960s. He played at representative level for Yorkshire, and at club level for Castleford (Heritage № 349), Leeds (Heritage №), York, Keighley and Hunslet, and coached at club level for Hunslet.

Background
Fred Ward's birth was registered in Leeds North district, West Riding of Yorkshire, England, he worked at Glasshoughton colliery, he died aged 80 in Castleford, West Yorkshire, his funeral service took place at All Saints Church, Hightown, Lumley Street, Castleford, at 10am on Wednesday 28 November 2012, followed by a committal at Pontefract Crematorium, Wakefield Road, Pontefract.

Playing career

County honours
Fred Ward won cap(s) for Yorkshire while at Hunslet.

Championship Second Division appearances
Fred Ward played, and was coach and captain in Hunslet's victory in the Championship Second Division during the 1962–63 season.

Challenge Cup Final appearances
Fred Ward played , and was coach and captain in Hunslet's 16-20 defeat by Wigan in the 1965 Challenge Cup Final during the 1964–65 season at Wembley Stadium, London on Saturday 8 May 1965, in front of a crowd of 89,016.

County Cup Final appearances
Fred Ward played , and was coach and captain in Hunslet's 12-2 victory over Hull Kingston Rovers in the 1962 Yorkshire County Cup Final during the 1968–69 season at Headingley Rugby Stadium, Leeds on Saturday 27 October 1962, and played , and was coach and captain in the 8-17 defeat by Bradford Northern in the 1965 Yorkshire County Cup Final during the 1965–66 season at Headingley Rugby Stadium, Leeds on Saturday 16 October 1965.

Genealogical information
Fred Ward's marriage to Patricia M. (née Kenyon (birth registered third ¼ 1933 in Leeds North district)) was registered during third ¼ 1956 in Leeds district. They had children; Christine D. Ward (birth registered during third ¼  in Pontefract district), and Susan M. Ward (birth registered during second ¼  in Pontefract district). Fred Ward was the older brother of Sheila Ward (birth registered during second ¼ 1934 in Pontefract district), Kenneth Ward (birth registered during second ¼ 1940 in Pontefract district), and Maureen Ward (birth registered during second ¼ 1942 in Pontefract district). Fred Ward was the uncle of the rugby league footballer and coach; Paul Anderson.

References

External links
Search for "Ward" at rugbyleagueproject.org
Former Hull KR star Moore dies, aged 71
 
 
 
Photograph "Hunslet RLFC ~ 1962–63 season championship Second Division Champions"
 
Wigan Win Rugby Cup 1965
 Obituary at announce.jpress.co.uk
Fred Ward Memory Box Search at archive.castigersheritage.com

1932 births
2012 deaths
Castleford Tigers players
English rugby league coaches
English rugby league players
Hunslet F.C. (1883) captains
Hunslet F.C. (1883) coaches
Hunslet F.C. (1883) players
Keighley Cougars players
Leeds Rhinos players
Rugby league players from Leeds
Rugby league locks
York Wasps players
Yorkshire rugby league team players